Johnson County School District #1 is a public school district based in Buffalo, Wyoming, United States.

Geography
Johnson County School District #1 serves all of Johnson County, including the following communities:

Incorporated places
City of Buffalo
Town of Kaycee
Unincorporated places
Linch
Saddlestring

Schools
Buffalo High School (Grades 9–12)
Clear Creek Middle School (Grades 6–8)
Cloud Peak Elementary School (Grades 4–5)
Meadowlark Elementary School (Grades K-3)
Kaycee School (Grades K-12)

Student demographics
The following figures are as of October 1, 2008.

Total District Enrollment: 1,222
Student enrollment by gender
Male: 629 (51.47%)
Female: 593 (48.53%)
Student enrollment by ethnicity
White (not Hispanic): 1,165 (95.34%)
Hispanic: 30 (2.45%)
American Indian or Alaskan Native: 13 (1.06%)
Asian or Pacific Islander: 8 (0.65%)
Black (not Hispanic): 6 (0.49%)

See also
List of school districts in Wyoming

References

External links
Johnson County School District #1 – official site.

Education in Johnson County, Wyoming
School districts in Wyoming
Buffalo, Wyoming